Leonardo dos Santos Lima (born February 24, 1991), also known as Leozinho (レオジーニョ), is a Brazilian football player. He plays for Tochigi Uva FC.

Career
Leozinho joined to J3 League club; SC Sagamihara in 2015. In July, he moved to FC Maruyasu Okazaki.

Club statistics
Updated to 20 February 2016.

References

External links

Profile at FC Maruyasu Okazaki

1991 births
Living people
Brazilian footballers
J3 League players
Japan Football League players
SC Sagamihara players
FC Maruyasu Okazaki players
Tochigi City FC players
Brazilian expatriate footballers
Expatriate footballers in Japan
Association football forwards
Footballers from Rio de Janeiro (city)